Otaces is a monotypic moth genus of the family Erebidae. Its only species, Otaces lineata, is known from Panama. Both the genus and the species were first described by Herbert Druce in 1891.

References

Herminiinae
Monotypic moth genera